Baulne-en-Brie (literally Baulne in Brie) is a former commune in the department of Aisne in northern France. On 1 January 2016, it was merged into the new commune Vallées-en-Champagne, of which it is a delegated commune.

Geography
Baulne-en-Brie is located some 15 km east by south-east of Château-Thierry and 20 km west by south-west of Épernay. It can be accessed by the D4 road from Condé-en-Brie in the west through the heart of the commune and the village and continuing east to Le Breuil. There is also a country road from La Chapelle-Monthodon in the north. The south-eastern border of the commune is part of the border between the departments of Aisne and Marne. There are three hamlets in the commune other than the village: Montchevret, Grande Fontaine, and Romandie. There are extensive forests in the north, centre, south-east and south of the commune with the rest of the area being farmland.

The Verdonnelle stream flows north-west through the southern part of the commune passing near the hamlet of Romandie and continuing north-west out of the commune. The Surmelin stream flows from the south-east passing through the village and continuing north-west to join the Marne near Mézy-Moulins.

Neighbouring communes and villages

Administration

List of Successive Mayors of Baulne-en-Brie

Demography
In 2012 the commune had 262 inhabitants.

Economy
Baulne-en-Brie is an agricultural and wine-producing village and a part of the Appellation d'origine contrôlée (AOC) zone for "Champagne of Aisne".

Culture and heritage

Civil heritage
The commune has two sites that are registered as historical monuments:
The Madame Max Park
The Chateau Park

Other sites of interest
The Place Daniel Beaucreux in front of the church. In memory of the men and women of the Canton of Condé-en-Brie and the region who experienced deportation and death in the Nazi concentration camps. Marked: "Dead in Deportation, alive in our memories".
A Lavoir (Public laundry) in the main street has been decorated on the theme of the fable "The dairy and milk jug".
Little Switzerland of Condé, the area around the hamlet of Romandie, gives access to the Verdonnelle valley.
A Directional table opposite the Chemin de Glapiers on the road to Saint-Agnan offers an outstanding view of the Surmelin valley.

Religious heritage

The commune has several religious buildings and structures that are registered as historical monuments:
The Church of Saint Bartholomew (12th century). It has one of the last wooden ceilings with alternating grain slats in the world. The Church contains three items that are registered as historical objects:
A Funeral Plaque of Madeleine de Castellan, widow of Louis Mallart, Counsellor to the King (1633)
The Tombstone of Guillaume de Baulne (1255)
A Pulpit with 3 Bas-reliefs (16th century)

See also
Communes of the Aisne department

References

External links
Baulne-en-Brie on the old National Geographic Institute website 
Baulne-en-Brie on the Union for initiative of the canton of Condé-en-Brie official website 
Baulne-en-Brie official website 
The Prison Door from La Petite Roquette prison 

Former communes of Aisne
Populated places disestablished in 2016